Antonio Santarelli may refer to:
 Antonio Santarelli (archaeologist) (1832–1920), Italian archaeologist
 Antonio Santarelli (Jesuit) (1569–1649), Italian Jesuit